Sri Venkateswara Institute of Science & Technology (College code : SVIK)) is an engineering college in Kadapa, Andhra Pradesh, India.  It is situated 5 km away from Kadapa city  and was established in 2007 by the Sri Venkateswara Educational Society.

The college was established by Rajoli Veera Reddy. It is approved by the All India Council for Technical Education (AICTE), affiliated to Jawaharlal Nehru Technological University, Anantapur, Andhra Pradesh. Its faculty includes Prof. Veera Mohan Reddy, Associate Prof. Purushottam, where Prof. Mohan serves as the Head of the Department for the freshman year and Mathematics.

Degrees offered
 B.E/B.Tech    Electrical & Electronics Engineering
 B.E/B.Tech    Computer Science and Engineering
 B.E/B.Tech    Electronics & Communication Engineering
 B.E/B.Tech    Mechanical Engineering
 B.E/B.Tech    Civil Engineering

References

External links

Engineering colleges in Andhra Pradesh
Universities and colleges in Kadapa district
Kadapa
Educational institutions established in 2007
2007 establishments in Andhra Pradesh